(It is good for you that I leave), 108, is a church cantata by Johann Sebastian Bach. He composed it in Leipzig for Cantate Sunday, the fourth Sunday after Easter, and first performed it on 29 April 1725.

It is the second of nine cantatas on texts by Christiana Mariana von Ziegler, with whom he collaborated at the end of his second cantata cycle. She used two quotations from the prescribed gospel from the Farewell discourses and closed the cantata with a stanza from Paul Gerhardt's "". The topic is the prediction of Jesus of his parting and the coming of the Spirit as a comforter. The first announcement is sung by the bass as the vox Christi, the second, in the centre of the work, by the chorus in three fugues combined in motet style but unified by similar themes. Bach scored the cantata for three vocal soloists (alto, tenor and bass), a four-part choir, and a Baroque instrumental ensemble of two oboes d'amore, strings and continuo. He used elements of word-painting, such as very long notes to illustrate firm belief, and sigh motifs interrupted by rests to illustrate the desiring heart.

History and words 
Bach composed the cantata in his second year in Leipzig for the Fourth Sunday after Easter, called Cantate. The prescribed readings for the Sunday were from the Epistle of James, "Every good gift comes from the Father of lights", and from the Gospel of John, Jesus announcing the Comforter in his Farewell discourses. In his second year Bach had composed chorale cantatas between the first Sunday after Trinity and Palm Sunday, but for Easter returned to cantatas on more varied texts, possibly because he lost his librettist.

Between Easter and Pentecost Bach's congregation heard a series of nine cantatas with texts by a new librettist, Christiana Mariana von Ziegler. As the average interval between the performances was less than a week (they were not only for Sundays; there were additional ones for Ascension Day and Pentecost), Bach may have been composed at a correspondingly intense rate, although it is not known when he began work on them. It begins with a bass solo as the  delivering a quotation from the gospel; a second quotation appears in movement 4. Movements 2 and 3 deal with the hope for salvation; movement 5 is a prayer for guidance until death. The poet used as the closing chorale the tenth stanza of Paul Gerhardt's hymn "" (1653), expressing faith in God's guidance.

Publication 
The cantata text was published in 1728 in Ziegler's first collection, .  The version set by Bach was slightly different, as he shortened the text here as in other cantatas by the same librettist. The music survived in a holograph manuscript, but was not published until 1876 when the cantata appeared in the Bach Gesellschaft´s first complete edition of Bach's work.

Music

Structure and scoring 

Bach structured the cantata in six movements, beginning with a biblical quotation for the vox Christi, Jesus speaking. A set of aria and recitative is followed by a chorus on another biblical quotation from the gospel, while an aria leads to the closing chorale. Bach scored the work for three vocal soloists (alto (A), tenor (T) and bass (B)), a four-part choir, and a Baroque instrumental ensemble of two oboes d'amore (Oa), two violins (Vl), viola (Va) and basso continuo. The duration of the cantata is given as 20 minutes.

In the following table of the movements, the scoring follows the Neue Bach-Ausgabe. The keys and time signatures are taken from Alfred Dürr, using the symbol for common time (4/4). The continuo, playing throughout, is not shown.

Movements 
The cantata presents similarities to the one Bach wrote the previous year for the same occasion, .

1 
The similarities begin with the first movement, which like that of the previous year's cantata, is given to the bass as the vox Christi. The movement is the quotation of verse 7 from the gospel, beginning: "" (It is good for you that I leave; for if I did not go, the Comforter would not come to you.) It is between aria and arioso. An oboe d'amore as the obbligato instrument plays extended melodies. Voice and oboe share the musical material, conveying "the mood of grieving at parting".

2 
The following aria, "" (No doubt can disturb me), is dominated by a virtuoso solo violin. The words "Ich glaube" (I believe) are illustrated by very long notes in the voice, while an ostinato bass line renders "steadfastness" in a different way. The musicologist Julian Mincham notes that Bach uses the key F-sharp minor selectively, "often for slowish movements of great expressive force", for example for the alto aria Buß und Reu from his St Matthew Passion.

3 
A short secco recitative expresses "" (Thus Your Spirit will guide me, so that I walk on the right path).

4 
The next biblical quotation, verse 13 of the gospel, "" (But when that one, the Spirit of Truth, shall come, He shall lead you into all truth.) is rendered by the choir. It is divided in three sections, similar to a da capo form. All three parts are fugues, combined in motet style, the instruments playing mostly colla parte with the voices. The second section begins "" (For He will not speak of His own accord); the third section expresses "" (and what is to come, He will foretell), on a fugue subject similar to the first, giving the movement a "feeling of unity".

5 
The last aria,"" (What my heart desires from You), is accompanied by the strings, dominated by the first violin. The word "Herz" (heart) is rendered in sighing motifs, intensified by following rests.

6 
The closing chorale, "" (Your Spirit, which God sends from heaven, leads everything that loves Him), is a four-part setting on the melody of "". The bass line is pacing forward constantly.

Recordings 
The selection is taken from the listing on the Bach Cantatas Website. Vocal ensembles with one voice per part (OVPP) and instrumental groups playing period instruments in historically informed performances are marked green.

References

Sources 
 
 Es ist euch gut, dass ich hingehe BWV 108; BC A 72 / Sacred cantata (4th Sunday of Easter) Bach Digital
 BWV 108 Es ist euch gut, daß ich hingehe English translation, University of Vermont
 Luke Dahn:BWV 108.6 bach-chorales.com

Church cantatas by Johann Sebastian Bach
1725 compositions